Narragansett Baptist Church (also known as South Ferry Church) is an historic Baptist church building located at 170 South Ferry Road, in Narragansett, Rhode Island.

History
The wooden church was designed by Thomas A. Tefft in the Carpenter Gothic style, and built in 1850.

South Ferry was a thriving textile village in the mid-nineteenth century, but by 1908 the Baptist congregation moved to a building 1 mile away.

The South Ferry Memorial Society acquired and maintained the building for the next 65 years.

The building was extensively repaired after suffering damage during the Hurricane of 1938. In 1974 the University of Rhode Island received title to the property, and the building is currently maintained by a private non-profit, Friends of the South Ferry Church.

The church building was added to the National Register of Historic Places in 1977.

Images

See also
National Register of Historic Places listings in Narragansett, Rhode Island

References

External links
SouthFerryChurch.org: Official church website

Baptist churches in Rhode Island
Buildings and structures in Narragansett, Rhode Island
Churches in Washington County, Rhode Island
Churches completed in 1850
19th-century Baptist churches in the United States
Churches on the National Register of Historic Places in Rhode Island
National Register of Historic Places in Washington County, Rhode Island
Carpenter Gothic church buildings in the United States
Gothic Revival church buildings in Rhode Island